The International F-17 Sportsman was a 1920s American three-seat open-cockpit biplane designed and manufactured by the International Aircraft Corporation in Long Beach, California and Cincinnati, Ohio. 107 aircraft were built, 77 of them at Cincinnati.

In 1928, a Sportsman won the "On to Dallas" race.

Variants
''Data from:
F-17 Sportsmanpowered by a  Curtiss OX-5 water-cooled V-8 or  Dayton Bear air-cooled 4-cylinder in-line engine.

F-17H Sportsman powered by,  Wright-Hisso E, Siemens-Halske, Dayton Bear or Curtiss K-6 engines.

F-17H Mailman A single seat air mail carrier / cargo version of the 17H.

F-17W Sportsmanpowered by a   Wright J-5

Operators

 Airads
 Anderson Airlines
 Cherry-Red Airlines
 Crescent Air Services
 Galt Union High School

Specifications (F-17)

References

Further reading

 

1920s United States civil utility aircraft
Biplanes